NBC 6 may refer to one of the following television stations in the United States that are currently affiliated or were former affiliates of NBC:

Current affiliates
KBJR-TV in Superior, Wisconsin / Duluth, Minnesota
KCEN-TV in Temple/Waco/Killeen, Texas
KHQ-TV in Spokane, Washington
KPVI in Pocatello/Idaho Falls, Idaho
KRIS-TV in Corpus Christi, Texas
KSBY in San Luis Obispo/Santa Maria/Santa Barbara, California
KSNL-LD in Salina, Kansas	
Full satellite of KSNW, Wichita, Kansas
KTAL-TV in Texarkana, Texas / Shreveport, Louisiana
KTVM-TV in Butte/Bozeman, Montana (a part of NBC Montana)
Semi-satellite of KECI-TV, Missoula, Montana
KWQC-TV in Davenport, Iowa (Quad Cities)
WCSH-TV in Portland, Maine
WDSU in New Orleans, Louisiana
WECT in Wilmington, North Carolina
WJAC-TV in Johnstown/Altoona, Pennsylvania
WLUC-TV in Marquette, Michigan
WOWT in Omaha, Nebraska
WPSD-TV in Paducah, Kentucky / Cape Girardeau, Missouri
WTVJ, Miami, Florida (O&O)
WVVA in Bluefield/Beckley, West Virginia

Formerly affiliated
CMQ-TV in Havana, Cuba (1951 to 1960)
KOBG-TV in Silver City, New Mexico (2000 to 2011)
Was a satellite of KOB in Albuquerque
KMOH in Kingman, Arizona (1999 to 2004)
Was a satellite of KPNX in Phoenix
KMIR-TV in Palm Springs, California (broadcasts over the air on channel 36; was branded by its cable channel number such as KMIR 6 from 1985 to 2013)
WRTV in Indianapolis, Indiana (1956 to 1979)
WRGB in Albany, New York (1954 to 1981)
WCNC-TV in Charlotte, North Carolina (broadcasts over the air on channel 36; was branded as NBC 6 from 1996 to 1998 and as WCNC 6 from 1998 to 2006)
WATE-TV in Knoxville, Tennessee (1953 to 1979)
WTVR-TV in Richmond, Virginia (1948 to 1955)